The DRG Class 86 was a standard (see Einheitsdampflokomotive) goods train tank locomotive with the Deutsche Reichsbahn-Gesellschaft. It was intended for duties on branch lines and was delivered by almost all the locomotive building firms working for the Reichsbahn. From 1942 it was built in a simplified version as a 'transitional war locomotive' (Übergangskriegslokomotive or ÜK). The most obvious changes were the omission of the second side windows in the cab and the solid disc carrying wheels.

History 

Almost all German locomotive factories took part in building these engines, 775 examples being produced in the period from 1928 to 1943. Its area of operations was predominantly the routes in Germany's Central Uplands (Mittelgebirge); as a result the first 10 units were given a Riggenbach counter-pressure brake. Twenty locomotives were destroyed during the Second World War; lightly damaged engines were repaired. Of the original 775 units, 175 went to the GDR railways, 385 to the Deutsche Bundesbahn, 29 to the Austrian Federal Railways (ÖBB), 44 to the PKP in Poland as the Class TKt3, 73 to the SZD and 62 to the CSD (6 of which later went to the SZD and 86 043 in 1958 to the GDR). On the last-mentioned 62 engines 28 became the CSD Class 455.2. Only 2 engines are still unaccounted for (86 016 and 86 469). The ÖBB began to retire them as early as 1945, but the last did not retire until 1972. However the Austrian engines had some of the most spectacular duties, including working double-headed on heavy, empty, ore trains with a DRB Class 52.

The Bundesbahn stationed most of its 86's in Nuremberg for the Franconian branch lines and the marshalling yards there. The locomotive shed at Hof, Germany was also renowned Class 86 territory. Short, semi-fast trains were also regularly hauled by the Class 86. The DB retired its last one in 1974.

In the GDR railways the 86's were mainly stationed at Aue engine shed (with over 50 engines) for the surrounding Ore Mountain routes. Some DR engines stationed at Heringsdorf shed on the island of Usedom were even given  smoke deflectors. One well-known service was a fast-stopping train with 7 Bghw coaches, but light express trains were also on their schedule in the Central Uplands. The Class 86's last (official) year in service in the DR was 1976, but several engines continued to run on into the 1980s. Since its inauguration in 1928, no. 86 001/86 1001 was under steam almost every day, but in its latter years was often just used as a heating engine. Its last duties were on the stub line from Schlettau to Crottendorf, where it ended its steam services in 1988. Together with 86 501 this loco was once again taken into scheduled service for a week in 1989 to celebrate the centenary of the route. With a service age of 60 years, it became the longest serving of all the standard locomotives to be placed in scheduled service by a national railway. Since 1999, no. 86 001 has been mothballed. No. 86 1056 met a tragic end in 1989 when she was the last victim of the GDR's scrapping madness and was converted into a mobile steam dispenser. Its driving gear and cylinders went into the furnace.

Preserved locomotives

Preserved engines include the 86 001 (Chemnitz), the oldest machine of its class, 86 049 (VSE Schwarzenberg), 86 056 (ÖGEG), 86 333, 86 457, 86 501 (ÖGEG), 86 607 (VMD loan to Adorf, a ÜK variant) and 86 744 of the GDR. 86 056 and 86 501 (both GDR) were sold to Austria. Preserved DB engines include the 86 457 at the DB Museum, which unfortunately was badly damaged in the fire at the Nuremberg 1 locomotive shed (the museums depot of the Nuremberg Transport Museum). In all over 12 locomotives remain (excluding memorial ones), of which 9 are in Germany.

In Poland no. 86 240 remains as no. Tkt3-16. No. 86 348 is being refurbished by the GES, but stood formerly as a monument in Breuningerland in Ludwigsburg/Tamm.

See also
 List of DRG locomotives and railbuses

References 

 
 
 
 
Günter Kettler u.a.: ÖBB-Reihe 86, (this book shows all Class 86-locomotives of the Austrian Federal Railways in service in Austria); Verlag www.bahnmedien.at, Wien 2021, ISBN 978-3-903177-33-8

86
2-8-2T locomotives
86
Krupp locomotives
Railway locomotives introduced in 1928
Borsig locomotives
Esslingen locomotives
Henschel locomotives
Berliner locomotives
Freight locomotives
Standard gauge locomotives of Germany
1′D1′ h2t locomotives
Maschinenbau-Gesellschaft Karlsruhe locomotives
Schichau-Werke locomotives